Dichogama redtenbacheri, the caper-leaf webworm moth, is a moth in the family Crambidae. It was described by Julius Lederer in 1863. It is found in Florida, the West Indies, Costa Rica and South America.

The wingspan is about 28 mm. Adults have been recorded on wing year round.

The larvae feed on Capparis species, including Capparis cynophallophora. They fold or spin together the leaves with silk to make a shelter.

References

Moths described in 1863
Dichogamini